is a Japanese professional wrestler, better known by his ring name . He is currently working for the Japanese professional wrestling promotion DDT Pro-Wrestling (DDT). He is the son of actor Tetsu Watanabe.

Professional wrestling career

Independent circuit (2005–present)
One of the rising stars of DDT Pro-Wrestling in 2007, Honda started his career as one of the "Four Italian Horsemen". He later became the leader of the aWo (Aloha World Order) stable, mainly sticking to a comedic gimmick. Honda made his professional wrestling debut as A. Yazawa at the Guts World Prowrestling's Guts World Vol. 2 event from March 15, 2005, where he teamed up with Cabbage Taro in a losing effort to Gutara and Potato Saburota. He participated in one of the longest matches in professional wrestling history, a 108-man battle royal at Tenka Sanbun no Kei: New Year's Eve Special, a cross-over event held between Big Japan Pro Wrestling, DDT and Kaientai Dojo from December 31, 2009, competing against other infamous wrestlers such as Great Kojika, Taka Michinoku, Kenny Omega, Abdullah Kobayashi, and the winner of the match, Jun Kasai. On November 2, 2016, at Wrestle-1's W-1 Tour 2016 Autumn Bout, Honda teamed up with Konosuke Takeshita as part of the Happy Motel stable to defeat Keiji Mutoh and Jiro Kuroshio. At Ice Ribbon's New Ice Ribbon #700 (RibbonMania 2015: Neko Nitta Retirement Show) from December 31, 2015, he teamed up with Mochi Miyagi to defeat Gentaro and Yuji Hino, and Jun Kasai and Miyako Matsumoto in a three-way intergender tag team match. On April 5, 2019, at the WrestleCon Joey Ryan's Penis Party, a freelance event held and produced by Joey Ryan, Honda participated in a 7-person gauntlet match also involving Danshoku Dino, Makoto Oishi, Sanshiro Takagi, Mao, Maki Itoh and Yoshihiko (a love doll) for the Ironman Heavymetalweight Championship.

DDT Pro-Wrestling/Pro Wrestling Basara (2005–present)
Honda defeated Gentaro at Never Mind 2010 to become the interim KO-D Openweight Champion. A unification match took place at Sweet Dreams! 2011 on January 30, where he was eventually defeated by Dick Togo.

He is a former multiple-time KO-D 6-Man Tag Team Champion, title which he won as part of Monster Army alongside stablemates Daisuke Sasaki, Hoshitango, and Yuji Hino at Sweet Dreams! on January 27, and Road to Ryōgoku in Hiroshima: Dramatic Dream Toukasan on June 23, 2013. He also won the championship as part of the Happy Motel stable alongside Konosuke Takeshita and Tetsuya Endo at Road to Ryōgoku in Osaka: Dramatic Dream Tsutenkaku on July 13, 2014.

On April 28, 2019, he defeated Harashima in a Panty-Hunt Tiger Club Rope Deathmatch at Max Bump 2019 to win the DDT Extreme Championship.

At Kawasaki Strong 2021 on February 14, Honda teamed up with Kazuki Hirata, Shinya Aoki and Super Sasadango Machine to win the vacant KO-D 8-Man Tag Team Championship by defeating Danshoku Dino, Makoto Oishi, Sanshiro Takagi and Toru Owashi.

Championships and accomplishments
DDT Pro-Wrestling
DDT Extreme Championship (2 times)
Interim KO-D Openweight Championship (1 time)
Ironman Heavymetalweight Championship (19 times)
Jiyūgaoka 6-Person Tag Team Championship (1 time) – with Kudo and Yasu Urano
KO-D 6-Man Tag Team Championship (3 times) – with Daisuke Sasaki and Yuji Hino (1), Yuji Hino and Hoshitango (1), and Konosuke Takeshita and Tetsuya Endo (1)
KO-D 8-Man Tag Team Championship (2 times, current) – with Kazuki Hirata, Super Sasadango Machine and Shinya Aoki (1), and Toru Owashi, Kazuki Hirata and Yoshihiko (1)
KO-D Tag Team Championship (2 times) – with Daisuke Sasaki (1) and Prince Togo (1)
Gatoh Move Pro Wrestling
IWA Triple Crown Championship (1 time)
Pro-Wrestling Basara
UWA World Trios Championship (1 time) – with Francesco Togo and Piza Michinoku
Pro Wrestling Illustrated
Ranked No. 496 of the top 500 singles wrestlers in the PWI 500 in 2021

References

External links
 

1978 births
Living people
Japanese male professional wrestlers
21st-century professional wrestlers
UWA World Trios Champions
DDT Extreme Champions
Jiyūgaoka 6-Person Tag Team Champions
KO-D 6-Man Tag Team Champions
KO-D 8-Man/10-Man Tag Team Champions
KO-D Tag Team Champions
KO-D Openweight Champions